The 1976 Nippon Professional Baseball season was the 27th season of operation for the league.

Regular season standings

Central League

Pacific League

Japan Series

Hankyu Braves won the series 4–3.

See also
1976 Major League Baseball season

References

1976 in baseball
1976 in Japanese sport